Moop Mama is a brass band based in Munich, Bavaria, Germany. The ten-person group includes two percussionists and a rapper, and was founded in 2009. They describe their style as urban brass, mixing hip hop and the music of traditional marching bands. The band has played at festivals, for television and film, and at political events, with a focus on spontaneous concerts in public space. Beginning in 2011, the band has recorded albums, singles and videos.

History 

Moop Mama was founded in 2009 at the initiative of the saxophonist Marcus Kesselbauer, as a group of seven brass players, two percussionists and a rapper. Kesselbauer is also the band's composer and arranger. Their first "public rehearsal" was at Munich's Englischer Garten in 2009. They became recognized for many short unannounced concerts in public space (Guerilla-Konzerte), such as pedestrian areas and parks, using a megaphone to amplify the rapper's voice. Sometimes the concerts were regarded as unwanted noise, causing conflicts with the police.

They have performed regularly for the local Vereinsheim Schwabing of Bayerischer Rundfunk (BR). For the film , they supplied part of the film score and appeared as actors.

They also played in the program of the 2012 Champions League final in Munich, and supporting Jan Delay at the Tollwood Festival.

In September 2012, the band played on an invitation of Goethe-Institut in Thessaloniki and Athens.  In September 2018, the band played a spontaneous concert at the Hambach Forest to protest against its clearing by RWE. On 21 June 2019, they performed as part of a large demonstration of Fridays for Future at the Aachen Tivoli for several thousand people. The band played a 10th anniversary concert at the Tollwood in the Munich Musik-Arena on 18 July 2019, announced as playing "no finished beats, no samples, no electronic instruments" and "brute loud and secretly quiet".

Discography

Albums 
 2011: Deine Mutter
 2013: Das rote Album (Millaphon Records)
 2016: M.O.O.P. Topia (Mutterkomplex)
 2017: Live, Vol. 1 (Mutterkomplex)
 2018: ICH (Mutterkomplex urban media)
 2020: Live Vol.2 (Mutterkomplex urban media)

Singles 
 2011: König der Stadtmitte (Millaphon Records)
 2012: Liebe (Millaphon Records)
 2013: Party der Versager (Millaphon Records)
 2014: Stadt die immer schläft (Millaphon Records)
 2016: Meermenschen (Mutterkomplex)
 2016: Lösch das Internet (Mutterkomplex)
 2016: Die Erfindung des Rades (Mutterkomplex)
 2017: 25/8 (Live 2016) (Mutterkomplex)
 2017: Komplize (Live 2016) (Mutterkomplex)
 2018: Molotow (Mutterkomplex)
 2018: Nüchtern (Mutterkomplex)
 2018: Kapuze (Mutterkomplex)

Videos 
 2012: Liebe
 2013: Party der Versager
 2014: Stadt die immer schläft
 2016: Meermenschen
 2016: Lösch das Internet
 2016: Die Erfindung des Rades
 2016: Alle Kinder (feat. Jan Delay)
 2017: Komplize (Live)
 2017: 25/8 (Live)
 2018: Molotow
 2018: Nüchtern
 2018: Kapuze

References

External links 

 
 
 
 Moop Mama Mutterkomplex
 Moop Mama (in German) laut.de
 Do, 14.11.2019 · MOOP MAMA (in German) landstreicher-konzerte.de 2019

Brass bands
Marching bands
German hip hop groups
2009 establishments in Germany